Reproductive medicine is a branch of medicine concerning the male and female reproductive systems. It encompasses a variety of reproductive conditions, their prevention and assessment, as well as their subsequent treatment and prognosis.

Reproductive medicine has allowed the development of artificial reproductive techniques (ARTs) which have allowed advances in overcoming human infertility, as well as being used in agriculture and in wildlife conservation. Some examples of ARTs include IVF, artificial insemination (AI) and embryo transfer, as well as genome resource banking.

History 
The study of reproductive medicine is thought to date back to Aristotle, where he came up with the “Haematogenous Reproduction Theory”. However, evidence-based reproductive medicine is traceable back to the 1970s. Since then, there have been many milestones for reproductive medicine, including the birth of Louise Brown, the first baby to be conceived through IVF in 1978. Despite this, it wasn't until 1989 that it became a clinical discipline thanks to the work of Iain Chalmers in developing the systematic review and the Cochrane collection.

Scope
Reproductive medicine addresses issues of sexual education, puberty, family planning, birth control, infertility, reproductive system disease (including sexually transmitted diseases) and sexual dysfunction. In women, reproductive medicine also covers menstruation, ovulation, pregnancy and menopause, as well as gynecologic disorders that affect fertility.

The field cooperates with and overlaps mainly with reproductive endocrinology and infertility, sexual medicine and andrology, but also to some degree with gynecology, obstetrics, urology, genitourinary medicine, medical endocrinology, pediatric endocrinology, genetics, and psychiatry.

Conditions 
Reproductive medicine deals with prevention, diagnosis and management of the following conditions. This section will give examples of a number of common conditions affecting the Human Reproductive system.

Infectious Diseases 
Reproductive Tract Infections (RTIs) are infections that affect the Reproductive Tract. There are three types of RTIs: Endogenous RTIs, Iatrogenic RTIs and Sexually Transmitted Infections.  Endogenous RTIs are caused by an overgrowth of bacteria which is normally present. An example of an endogenous RTI is Bacterial Vaginosis.

Iatrogenic RTIs are infections contracted as a result of a medical procedure.

Sexually Transmitted Infections (STIs) are infections spread by sexual activity, usually by vaginal intercourse, anal sex or oral sex. Many STIs are curable; however, some STIs such as HIV are incurable. STIs can be bacterial, viral or fungal and affect both men and women. Some examples of STIs are listed below:
 Bacterial STIs
 Chlamydia
 Gonorrhoea
 Syphilis
 Viral STIs
 Herpes
 Human Papilloma Virus (HPV)
 Human Immunodeficiency Virus (HIV)

Cancer 
Many parts of the Reproductive system can be affected by cancer. Below are some examples of Reproductive cancers:

Reproductive Cancers affecting Women 
 Breast cancer
 Ovarian cancer
 Uterine cancer
 Cervical cancer

Reproductive Cancers affecting Men 
 Prostate cancer
 Penile cancer
 Testicular cancer
 Male Breast cancer
 Benign prostatic hypertrophy

Conditions affecting Fertility 
A significant part of Reproductive Medicine involves promoting fertility in both men and women.

Causes of Infertility or Subfertility in Women 
 Ovulatory dysfunction
 Polycystic ovary syndrome (PCOS)
 Hypogonadotrophic hypogonadism
 Hypergonadotrophic hypogonadism
 Tubular dysfunction
 Pelvic inflammatory disease
 Endometriosis
 Previous sterilisation
 Previous surgery
 Cervical or Uterine dysfunction
 Congenital abnormalities
 Fibroids
 Asherman's syndrome
 Hormonal issues
 Hypothyroidism
 Hyperthyroidism
 Cushing's syndrome
 Congenital adrenal hyperplasia

Causes of Infertility or Subfertility in Men 
 Problems with Sperm Number or Function
 Cryptorchidism
 Y chromosome micro-deletions
 Varicocele
 Hypogonadotrophic hypogonadism
 Hypergonadotrophic hypogonadism
 Tubular dysfunction
 Congenital abnormalities
 Prior sexually transmitted infections
 Vasectomy
 Problems with Sperm Delivery
 Premature ejaculation
 Damage to the reproductive organs
 Retrograde ejaculation
 Certain genetic diseases

Disorders of Sex Development

Congenital Abnormalities

Congenital Abnormalities of the Female Reproductive system

 Cervical abnormalities
 Cervical agenesis
 Cervical duplication
 Hymen abnormalities
 Imperforate hymen
 Microperforate hymen
 Septate hymen
 Uterine abnormalities
 Duplicate uterus
 Unicornate uterus
 Septate uterus
 Vaginal abnormalities
 Transverse vaginal septum
 Vertical vaginal septum
 Vaginal agenesis
 Mayer-Rokitansky-Küster-Hauser syndrome
 Vulvar abnormalities
 Labial hypoplasia
 Labial hypertrophy

Congenital Abnormalities of the Male Reproductive system

 Cryptorchidism
 Hypospadias
 Epispadias

Endocrine Disorders

Disorders due to hormone excess 
 Polycystic ovarian syndrome (PCOS)
 Granulosa cell tumour
 Leydig cell tumour
 Teratoma

Disorders due to hormone deficiency 
 Hypogonadism
 Turner's syndrome
 Klinefelter's syndrome

Disorders due to hormone hypersensitivity 
 Idiopathic hirsutism

Disorders due to hormone resistance 
 Androgen insensitivity syndrome
 5a-reductase deficiency

Non-functioning endocrine tumours 
 Ovarian cysts
 Carcinoma
 Teratoma
 Seminoma

Secondary Endocrine disorders (originating in the pituitary gland) 
 Pituitary gonadotrophinoma
 Hypopituitarism
 Kallmann's syndrome

Assessment and treatment 

Assessment and treatment of reproductive conditions is a key area of reproductive medicine.

Female assessment starts with a full medical history (anamnesis) which provides details of the woman's general health, sexual history and relevant family history.  A physical examination will also take place to identify abnormalities such as hirsutism, abdominal masses, infection, cysts or fibroids. A blood test can inform the clinician of the endocrine status of the patient. Progesterone levels are measured to check for ovulation, and other ovulatory hormones can also be measured. Imaging techniques such as pelvic ultrasounds can also be used to assess the internal anatomy.

Male assessment also starts with a history and physical examination to look for any visible abnormalities. Investigations of semen samples also take place to assess the volume, motility and number of sperm, as well as identifying infections.

Once the investigations are complete, treatment of identified conditions can occur. For fertility issues, this may involve assisted reproductive technology (ART) such as in-vitro fertilisation (IVF) or fertility medication. There are surgical methods that can be used as treatment however these are now performed less frequently due to the increasing success of the less invasive techniques. Treatment is also required for sexually transmitted infections (STIs). These can take the form of antibiotics for bacterial infections such as chlamydia or highly active anti-retroviral therapy (HAART) for the HIV virus.

Education and training
Specialists in reproductive medicine usually undergo training in obstetrics and gynecology followed by training in reproductive endocrinology and infertility, or in urology followed by training in andrology. For reproductive medicine specialists in contraception, other methods of training are possible. Specialists tend to be organized in specialty organizations such as the American Society for Reproductive Medicine (ASRM) and European Society of Human Reproduction and Embryology (ESHRE).

Anamnesis
The anamnesis or medical history taking of issues related to reproductive or sexual medicine may be inhibited by a person's reluctance to disclose intimate or uncomfortable information. Even if such an issue is on the person's mind, he or she often doesn't start talking about such an issue without the physician initiating the subject by a specific question about sexual or reproductive health. Some familiarity with the doctor generally makes it easier for person to talk about intimate issues such as sexual subjects, but for some people, a very high degree of familiarity may make the person reluctant to reveal such intimate issues. When visiting a health provider about sexual issues, having both partners of a couple present is often necessary, and is typically a good thing, but may also prevent the disclosure of certain subjects, and, according to one report, increases the stress level.

Ethical and medicolegal issues 
There are many ethical and legal issues surrounding reproductive medicine. In the UK the Human Fertilisation and Embryology Authority (HEFA) regulates many aspects of reproductive medicine in the UK, including IVF, Artificial Insemination, storage of reproductive tissue and research in this field. HEFA was established due to the Human Fertilisation and Embryology Act (1990). This act was reviewed and the Human Fertilisation and Embryology Act (2008) was passed through parliament as an update to the 1990 act.

For therapies such as IVF, many countries have strict guidelines. In the UK, referrals are only given to women under 40 who have either undergone 12 cycles of artificial insemination, or have tried and failed to conceive for 2 years. While NICE recommends NHS clinical commissioning groups (CCGs) to provide 3 NHS funded cycles of IVF, many only offer 1 cycle, with some only offering IVF in exceptional circumstances on the NHS. If an individual does not meet the criteria or has gone through the maximum number of NHS-funded cycles, the individual will have to pay for private treatment

Many reproductive technologies are seen to have ethical problems, including IVF, mitochondrial replacement therapy, germline modification, preimplantation genetic diagnosis.

There are many groups around the world which oppose to ARTs, including religious groups and pro-life charities such as LIFE.

References

Literature
 Lipshultz LI, Khera M, Atwal DT. Urology and the Primary Care Practitioner. Philadelphia: Elsevier, 2008.
 Naomi Pfeffer: The Stork and the Syringe: A Political History of Reproductive Medicine (Feminist Perspectives) Polity Press 1993, 
 Speroff L, Glass RH, Kase NG. Clinical Gynecologic Endocrinology and Infertility. Fifth Edition. Williams and Wilkins, Baltimore MD, 1994 

Gynaecology
Andrology
Endocrinology
Fertility medicine